Pope Sylvester III (c. 1000 – October 1063), born John in Rome, was Bishop of Rome and hence ruler of the Papal States from 20 January to March 1045.

Background
Christened John, he was born into the powerful Roman patrician family Crescentii. Upon the death of Pope John XIX in October 1032, the papal throne became the subject of dispute between rival factions of nobles. Theophylactus, a youth of about twenty, the son of Alberic III, Count of Tusculum, was supported by the nobles of Tusculum. Giovanni de' Crescenzi–Ottaviani was supported by the Crescenzi family. Alberic secured the election of his son through bribery. The nephew and namesake of Pope Benedict VIII, he took the name Benedict IX. The young man was not only unqualified, but led a reportedly dissolute life, and factional strife continued. A revolt in Rome led to Benedict IX being driven from the city in 1044.

Papacy 
John, bishop of Sabina, was elected after fierce and protracted infighting, c. 21 January 1045. He took the name Sylvester III. Benedict IX excommunicated him, and in March returned to Rome and expelled Sylvester, who himself returned to Sabina to again take up his office of bishop in that diocese.

Nearly two years later, on 20 December 1046, the Council of Sutri, summoned and presided over by the Emperor Henry III, deprived him of his bishopric and priesthood, and ordered him sent to a monastery for the rest of his life. This sentence was obviously suspended, because he continued to function and was recognized as bishop of Sabina until at least 1062. A successor bishop to the see of Sabina, Hubaldus, is recorded under Pope Alexander II, on October 1063, indicating that John must have died prior to that date.

Though some consider him to have been an antipope, Sylvester III continues to be listed as an official pope (1045) in Vatican lists.  A similar situation applies to Pope Gregory VI (1045–1046). Sylvester's pontifical name was used again by Antipope Theodoric because at that time he was not considered a legitimate pontiff.

Notes

References

J.N.D. Kelly and Michael J. Walsh, A Dictionary of Popes, second edition, Oxford University Press, 2010.
F. Donald Logan, A History of the Church in the Middle Ages, 2nd edition, Routledge, 2013.
Joseph H. Lynch, and Philip C. Adamo, The Medieval Church, Routledge, 2014. 
Richard P. McBrien, Lives of the Popes, HarperCollins, 2000.
Megan McLaughlin, Sex, Gender, and Episcopal Authority in an Age of Reform, 1000-1122, Cambridge University Press, 2010.
John-Peter Pham, Heirs of the Fisherman : Behind the Scenes of Papal Death and Succession, Oxford University Press, 2004.

 

Popes
Papal names
Italian popes
Cardinal-bishops of Sabina
11th-century archbishops
1000s births
1060s deaths
Year of birth uncertain
11th-century popes